René Rast (born 26 October 1986 in Minden) is a German professional racing driver and the 2017, 2019 and 2020 DTM champion. He is currently competing in Formula E with McLaren and previously drove for Audi Sport Abt Schaeffler from 2019 to 2021 before Audi left the sport at the end of 2021. He claimed overall wins at the 2012 and 2014 24 Hours of Spa, 2014 24 Hours of Nürburgring and a class win at the 2012 24 Hours of Daytona.

Career

After competing in karting and Formula BMW, Rast won the 2005 ADAC Volkswagen Polo Cup and was runner-up at the 2006 Seat León Supercopa Germany.

In 2007, he switched to sports car racing, where he won Porsche Carrera Cup Germany in 2008 and 2012, and Porsche Supercup and claimed three championships from 2010 to 2012. Rast also competed at the ADAC GT Masters from 2010 to 2012, winning the title in his last year.

He ran the 2011 12 Hours of Sebring with a Paul Miller Racing Porsche 911 GT3 RSR. Rast won the 2012 24 Hours of Daytona GT class, driving a Magnus Racing Porsche 911 GT3 Cup with co-drivers Andy Lally, Richard Lietz and team owner John Potter.

Rast won the 2012 and 2014 24 Hours of Spa with a factory-supported Audi R8 LMS with teams Phoenix and WRT respectively.

In the 2013 FIA GT Series, he claimed a win and five podiums with an WRT Audi R8. In the 2014 Blancpain Sprint Series, he claimed a win and three podiums. In 2016, he got three podiums with.

Rast debuted at the 2014 24 Hours of Le Mans with a Sébastien Loeb Racing Oreca-Nissan, finishing fourth in the LMP2 class. In 2015, he competed at two rounds of the FIA World Endurance Championship with a factory Audi R18 e-tron quattro, finishing fourth overall at the 6 Hours of Spa and seventh at the 24 Hours of Le Mans. In 2016, he raced full-time for G-Drive with an Oreca-Nissan LMP2, claiming a win at Bahrain and a second place at the 24 Hours of Le Mans and two third-place finishes at Silverstone and Austin.

Rast competed in two rounds of the 2016 Deutsche Tourenwagen Masters with an Audi RS5, finishing sixth at Hockenheim II race 1.

He won the 2017 DTM title in his first full year driving an Audi RS5 for Team Rosberg. After taking a record-breaking six consecutive race victories the following year, he missed out on a repeat title by only four points. Rast won the 2019 DTM Championship and scored his third series title the following season.

Formula E 
Rast debuted in Formula E at the 2016 Berlin ePrix replacing António Félix da Costa (who had a DTM commitment) at Team Aguri.

Rast returned to Formula E for the final six races of the 2019-20 season in Berlin, replacing the sacked Daniel Abt at Audi Sport ABT Schaeffler. He managed to score a podium finish in the fifth race where he crossed the line in third place. Rast drove for Audi as a permanent driver for the 2020-21 Formula E Championship, partnering Lucas di Grassi. 

Rast did not compete in the 2021–22 Formula E World Championship.

He made his return to the series in the 2022–23 season driving for the McLaren Formula E Team.

Racing record

Career summary

† As Rast was a guest driver, he was ineligible to score points.
* Season still in progress.

Complete Porsche Supercup results
(key) (Races in bold indicate pole position) (Races in italics indicate fastest lap)

† Did not finish the race, but was classified as he completed over 90% of the race distance.
‡ As Rast was a guest driver, he was ineligible to score points.

Complete FIA GT Series results

Complete FIA World Endurance Championship results

† As Rast was a guest driver, he was ineligible for points.
* Season still in progress.

24 Hours of Le Mans results

Complete IMSA SportsCar Championship results

† Points only counted towards the Michelin Endurance Cup, and not the overall LMP2 Championship.
* Season still in progress.

Complete Blancpain  GT Series Sprint Cup results

Complete Formula E results
(key) (Races in bold indicate pole position; races in italics indicate fastest lap)

Complete Deutsche Tourenwagen Masters results
(key) (Races in bold indicate pole position) (Races in italics indicate fastest lap)

† Did not finish the race, but was classified as he completed over 90% of the race distance.

References

External links

 
 

1986 births
Living people
24 Hours of Daytona drivers
24 Hours of Le Mans drivers
24 Hours of Spa drivers
ADAC GT Masters drivers
American Le Mans Series drivers
Blancpain Endurance Series drivers
Deutsche Tourenwagen Masters champions
Deutsche Tourenwagen Masters drivers
Formula BMW ADAC drivers
Formula E drivers
German racing drivers
People from Minden
Sportspeople from Detmold (region)
Porsche Supercup drivers
Racing drivers from North Rhine-Westphalia
Rolex Sports Car Series drivers
WeatherTech SportsCar Championship drivers
12 Hours of Sebring drivers
World Touring Car Cup drivers
Audi Sport drivers
Phoenix Racing drivers
W Racing Team drivers
Abt Sportsline drivers
Sébastien Loeb Racing drivers
G-Drive Racing drivers
Team Rosberg drivers
Team Joest drivers
Team Aguri drivers
FIA World Endurance Championship drivers
Walter Lechner Racing drivers
BMW M drivers
Jota Sport drivers
Nürburgring 24 Hours drivers
McLaren Racing drivers
Porsche Carrera Cup Germany drivers
Volkswagen Motorsport drivers